Siuraarjuk (Inuktitut syllabics: ᓯᐅᕌᕐᔪᒃ) formerly Siorarsuk Peninsula is a finger-shaped peninsula in northern Baffin Island in the Qikiqtaaluk Region of Nunavut, Canada. It juts into the Foxe Basin north of the Melville Peninsula.

Bowhead whales are known to congregate in the area until western Igloolik is ice-free, at which time they travel to that region.

References

Peninsulas of Baffin Island
Foxe Basin